Montenegrins form an ethnic minority in North Macedonia. According to the 2002 Macedonian census  there are 2,003 ethnic Montenegrins in Macedonia.

Further reading
 Marko Ćalasan, Computer systems prodigy

References

External links
Center for Montenegrin diaspora

 
North Macedonia
Ethnic groups in North Macedonia